Carter-Newton House (c. 1849) at 530 Academy Street, Madison, Georgia, is one of the grand homes of Madison built during its heyday, 1840–60, leading up to the Civil War. A classic four-over-four Greek Revival home, one of six of this type in Madison, it features a wide front porch supported by four large Ionic columns, eight 20' × 20' rooms plus three additional ones in back, 12½ foot ceilings downstairs, and nine fireplaces upstairs and down. The central structure seems largely unchanged from when it was constructed but in fact has undergone a number of alterations. Of special significance are the very impressive entrance hall, double parlors and the main and servants’ staircases. Pocket doors to the main parlors, added in 1906, still operate.

The house was built at the peak of the cotton boom in Morgan County, on the foundation of one of several academies operating in Madison during the first half of the 19th century starting with the two-story brick Madison Male Academy which was down the street and established by charter of the Georgia Legislature on December 16, 1815, and supported in part by the state in the form of fines and forfeitures levied in criminal prosecutions.

The Shepherd Family years
Not long after the academy burned down, Carter Shepherd and his wife Nancy Whitfield Shepherd, built the present wooden house, originally with eight rooms, over its foundations. Nancy Whitfield (6/18/1813–1898) was born in 1813 to the William Whitfield in neighboring Putnam County and married Carter in 1833. They had six children including William i1839, Sarah "Sallie" E. 1840, Annie 1845, Florence 1846, Carter Jr. 1848, and, in 1850, Robert, the first child born at the "Shepherd House".

According to Samuel Burney's letters home mentioned below, the Carter Shepherds were one of the most prosperous families in Morgan County, with a  plantation to the south of Madison and a small sawmill. Most important by far wealth-wise were their slaves; Nancy had 114 slaves, making her the fourth-largest slaveholder in the county at the time of the Civil War. Her husband had died two years before from an accident at his saw mill. His blood from that accident stained the floor. Mr. Shepherd's death in 1858 left Nancy as both plantation master and mother of six children to raise.

On November 8, 1860, Mrs. Shepherd's eldest daughter, Sallie, then 20, married Samuel A. Burney (4/26/1840-3/22/1896), who was the same age, a native of Morgan County and an honor graduate of Mercer College in Macon, Georgia. In September 1861, after teaching a year, he joined the Panola Guards of Thomas Cobb’s Georgia Legion, composed of many men from Madison and the county, and fought for the remainder of the war, mostly in Virginia. In Richmond, Lt. Burney met Vice President Alexander Stephens. After losing an eye from a wound at the Battle of Chancellorsville, he was eventually reassigned to Georgia to the Commissary department in south Georgia and was at the Shepherd House for a number of days until the morning of November 18, 1864, a day before General Slocum's troops marched through town, burning several cotton warehouses and part of the depot. Escaping town in the nick of time, he wrote that Mrs. Shepherd lost money, papers and watches among other things during the march.<ref>Burney, Samuel A. and Shepherd, Sarah E., "A Southern Soldier's Letters Home: The Civil War Letters of Samuel Burney, Cobb's Georgia Legion, Army of Northern Virginia", ed. Turner III, Nat S., Mercer University Press 2003.</ref>

Another soldier at the Shepherd House on the morning of November 18 was Captain Charles W. Baldwin, one of Morgan County’s most celebrated Civil War heroes. Immediately after graduating from Emory University at Oxford, he too had joined the Panola Guards. Having been wounded in the elbow at the Battle of Atlanta earlier that year and still not recovered, he was visiting Mrs. Shepherd's second daughter, Annie, on the eve of Madison's most momentous day. Years later, he wrote: “I was just regaining strength when General Sherman commenced his march through Georgia to the sea. On the day before his army reached Madison, I was visiting Miss Annie Shepherd (who was destined to become my wife) at the residence of her mother in that town. It being decided that I should ‘refuge’, Mrs. Shepherd gave me a gold watch and several thousand dollars to take care of for her – besides which I had my own watch and money on my person. Though barely able to ride horseback, my arm still in a sling, I undertook the trip of refugee…(and was captured two days later by Union troops, ending up in a horrid prison on Hilton Head Island, South Carolina and, later, a tolerable one in Washington, DC).”

In April 1865, at the end of the war, Sam Burney came back to Madison to live at the Shepherd House with his wife Sallie and run his mother-in-law’s plantation. Three months later, Captain Baldwin was released from prison and returned “wearing a splendid suit of clothes, which I had bought in Philadelphia with the money I had gotten for the Confederate notes I had sold”. Later that year, he married Sallie's sister, Annie, and was elected Clerk of the Superior Court of Morgan County, a post which he held for 38 years until his death. Two years later in 1867, Sam Burney re-enrolled at Mercer College to study for the ministry. In 1882, Burney became the Madison Baptist Church minister, a post he held for 10 years until his death.

The Carter Family years
Sam Burney's departure for Mercer left Nancy to run the plantation alone, without slaves – an impossible task. With all of her children fully grown and several married, she decided to sell the townhouse. Mary Watson Anderson (1/7/1800 – 2/11/1880) of neighboring Greene County was interested in purchasing it. Mary had lost her husband Stuart Anderson in the war in 1864, was without children, and found herself unable to maintain the Joseph Watson plantation house along the Oconee River. She became interested in the Shepherd House in Madison and convinced her niece, Electa Varner Carter (1833–1903) of Burke County, who was in the same predicament, to come live with her. So in 1868, Mary purchased the house and moved there along with Electa Carter and her daughter Anne Varner Carter (3/5/1860-3/3/1931), born in Burke County. Electa Carter brought along all of her family furniture. Mary, the second owner of the Shepherd House, brought only several of the finest pieces of Joseph Watson family furniture, also chairs and china, the remainder being sold at an auction at her death in 1880. She died at age 80 from “lung congestion” and willed the house to Electa Carter.

In 1888, Miss Joseph (“Josie”) Watson Varner (5/25/1875-4/2/1952), age 13, came from Arkansas to Madison to live at “Carter House” to be raised by Aunt Electa Carter and Anne, their older first cousin. Miss Josie traced her Watson relatives of Green County back to the mid-18th century in Virginia, her triple-great grandfather being Charles Bonar. His father, Edward Payson Newton, had moved to Morgan County in the 1840s. After the Civil War, Edward Payson had left his large plantation between Brownwood and Little Creek, 5+ miles south of Madison, for downtown Social Circle so that the children could attend school but he held on to the land. Edward Payson was the grandson of John Newton of Lexington, first ordained Presbyterian minister in Georgia. The following from the Oglethorpe County website is stated about John Newton, who grew up near Charlotte, North Carolina and attended seminary school there:

“Scotch-Irish emigrants from North Carolina, Virginia, and Pennsylvania brought the Presbyterian faith with them to Oglethorpe County. In 1785, the Reverend John Newton and a group of Pennsylvanians established Beth-Salem Church, the earliest Presbyterian church in the county and the first Presbyterian church in north Georgia. It was located a few miles southwest of Lexington. The church building was burned in 1817 by the Indians. The remaining members rebuilt the church at the same site and named it New Beth-Salem Church. In 1822, the Reverend Thomas Goulding relocated the church to Lexington and renamed it Lexington Presbyterian Church. The Beth-Salem/Lexington Presbyterian Church is the oldest continuously organized Presbyterian congregation in the Synod of Georgia. Some of Oglethorpe County's most prominent residents are buried in the church cemetery.”

The E. T. Newton's first child, Therese (8/6/1900-5/25/1994), was born at Carter House to be closer to medical help, she being the second and last person born at Carter House. Mrs. Carter died in 1903, willing the house to her only child. This left 43-year-old Anne Carter alone in a big house, so the Newton's in Brownwood invited her to come live with them. A year later, the Newton's had their second child, Edward Taylor Newton (8/16/04-1/3/83), born prematurely at the Newton home. Edward Newton senior, never of robust health, died 7 weeks later. In 1906, when Therese was of school age, Miss Josie decided to move into town, and Anne invited her and the children to come live with her at Carter House.

Miss Josie hired a carpenter, Mr. Ingram, and spent $6,000 in making many “improvements” to Carter House. The changes included, most notably, widening the porch to its present size and replacing the capitals and bases of the simple Doric columns with the fancier Ionic ones of today. Other changes included elongating the front downstairs windows, adding a front balcony, installing a dark walnut double front door with oval glass similar to that of Oak House two doors down, also an ornate metal ceiling in the formal parlor and the marble “Newton” carriage step along the street. She also added pocket doors to the two main parlors, a 1-story porch all along the back side (for the morning to avoid the sun) and, for the first time, an attached kitchen to one side of the house, with a small porch. City water and sewerage were introduced in Madison starting in 1907, and Carter House was one of the first to receive such.

In 1913, Miss Josie, remarried, taking William T. Bacon (1871-1/28/1944), the owner/editor/publisher of The Madisonian and the first Editor-In-Chief of The Red & Black, the UGA student newspaper. A modest man, highly regarded in the community and a close relative of the first Chief Justice of the Georgia Supreme Court, he was a church deacon, on the Board of Directors of the First National Bank of Madison for many years, and a member of various civic organizations. He was elected State Senator in 1942 and died in 1944. In 1968, he was elected to the Georgia Newspaper Hall of Fame at UGA's Grady College of Journalism, and his portrait-like photograph hangs next to that of Ralph McGill, his political opposite.

After living at Carter House for 7 years, the Bacon's purchased Bonar Hall on April 15, 1920, and moved there with Anne Carter. Thereafter, the house was rented to the well-known C. R. Mason family, who like the Bacon's were prominent Baptists. On March 1, 1941, the Mason's purchased the grand Victorian “Broughton House” two blocks away and moved out of Carter House, “C.R.” a few years later becoming State Senator following Mr. Bacon's death.

The Newton Family years
Ed Newton, who grew up in Carter House, graduated from Georgia Tech in 1926 and headed off for Connecticut for his first engineering job. He then took a year off to attend Yale Engineering School. Around 1930, he joined the Patent Office where his dad's first cousin, “Uncle Jim” Newton had been Commissioner of Patents. Evenings, he attended George Washington Law School, getting his LLB and Master of Laws. In 1939, he met Laura (“Polly”) Weihe (3/13/1909-10/12/2003), who grew up in Washington, D.C. Her father, Frederick August Weihe, a physicist, had immigrated from Germany and helped found the engineering schools at both the University of Delaware and North Carolina State University during the 1890s before joining the Patent Office. Her mother, Miriam Armstrong Weihe, was the grand daughter of Horatio Gates Armstrong of Philadelphia, who in 1858 patented one of the first paper-bag machines and became very wealthy therefrom. The youngest of five children, Polly had attended William & Mary College and had been a part-time dancer and worked in San Francisco and in Washington at the Egyptian Embassy before meeting Edward. They married the following year on August 17, 1940, at her mother's historic home, Baynard Hall, in Newark, Delaware.  Four months later following Pearl Harbor, Ed Newton joined the war effort.

Several years later on January 28, 1944, Mr. Bacon, then a prominent State Senator, died at age 73; both the governor and Margaret Mitchell sent condolences. His death prompted Mrs. Bacon to ask Ed to return to Madison to run the family businesses. So in the spring of 1944, “Colonel Ed” and Polly and their three children returned to Madison following his retirement from the Air Force. They moved into Carter House, which was somewhat neglected by then. He not only opened a patent office in downtown Atlanta, but also started managing the family-owned Madisonian newspaper and the unprofitable family farm and peach shed, which were later sold.

To furnish Carter House, the Newton's initially obtained some major antique pieces, including from local estate auctions such as that of Thurlston. The kitchen had an adjoining breakfast room, also a large iron wood-burning stove that was eventually removed as modern appliances were gradually added. In the back of the house was a one-room, flattish-roof wooden washhouse, a basic pigeon house and a large fenced-in area for some five Shetland ponies. In the mid-1950s, the two structures were removed and the ponies were moved to a lot further back, opening up the back area to become more of a garden as it is today.

Polly Newton headed up the Morgan County Chapter of the Red Cross for well over a decade and was one of the key Madisonians to re-establish the local Episcopal Church, she conducting the first confirmation classes. Very involved in city and school affairs, she served on the Board of the Cultural Center and was the longest-serving head of the local chapter of the DAR.  She also spearheaded the effort during the 1960s to rename Second Street, choosing “Academy Street” in recognition of the several early 19th century academies located along that street. Around 1960, Col. Ed and Polly started calling it the “Carter-Newton House” and made many improvements including modernizing the kitchen and rear porch area, removing the dark Queen Anne Style front door and installing an “original looking” front door and frame, putting small panes in the lower front windows, making “French doors” of two windows in the dining room, and adding a small back porch.

Col. Newton established the well-known Atlanta patent law firm of Newton & Hopkins, later, Newton, Hopkins & Ormsby, and was the first patent attorney in Georgia, highly regarded by the bar and federal court judges, and for years the leading patent attorney in the southeast. He taught patent law periodically at Emory and the University of Georgia and penned several important patent articles. During the 1960s and 1970s, the Newton's became world travellers. After his death from poor health on January 3, 1983, at age 78, Mrs. Newton continued opening the house during the city's periodic tours, traveling overseas, and hosting Weihe-Newton family reunions. In 1991, a scene from the made-for-TV movie, The Perfect Tribute'', about the events leading up to the Gettysburg Address, was shot in the area back of her home, and she forever raved about how easy it was talking to the affable Oscar-winning star, Jason Robards. She died of Alzheimer's disease on October 12, 2003, leaving the house to her three sons, and is buried alongside her husband in the Newton plot at the front of Old Madison Cemetery.

During the years following Polly Newton's death, the house fell into disrepair and was maintained as well as the family could.  In 2018 the house was the principal location for a major motion picture, "St Agatha", a horror set in the 1950s in small-town Georgia, a pregnant young woman named Agatha seeks refuge in a convent. The house was transformed into a convent and practically every room was used in the production.  As luck would have it, in 2019 the house was one of the main locations used in the 2019 filming for the 2021 drama, "Charming the hearts of men", a romantic drama set during the politically charged early 60s where a sophisticated woman returns to her Southern home town and discovers her options are limited yet discrimination is plentiful. With the help of a Congressional ally, she inspires historic legislation which allows opportunities and protections never before afforded to women. This made-for-Amazon movie prompted the re-model of the kitchen addition to include salvaged period windows overlooking the back yard and merged all the small rooms in the side addition and created a vast kitchen with black and white tiled floors.  The Dining room was re-imagined using distinctive wallpaper which provided visual impact.  The Side porch and upper bedroom was also used in many scenes.

The Glover Family years
James "Jim" Glover, who grew up in North Georgia and Paris, France, a first-generation American, born to American/French parents.  Jim, who holds dual-citizenship, was raised by his French Grandparents and enjoyed developing cultural and artistic qualities as well as a keen interest in history and preservation.  Graduating from Truett-McConnell University, with an AB Degree; West Georgia University with BBA and BS Degrees, and Georgia State University with MBA in International Business, Jim joined IBM Corporation.  Jim retired from his 36-year career at IBM in 2020, in which he took part in two international assignments which covered over half of his sales/marketing career in Paris, France and Vienna Austria.   Playing a major role in the re-establishment of the Central European IT Markets and the IBM Heritage Project of putting The Hermitage Museum online for the very first time in history.

When a friend took him to dinner one evening in Madison, he was certain that it was the place he wanted to spend his later years. The history, charming surroundings, and welcoming community was the deciding factor.  That very night, he picked two potential "Dream Homes", one being the Carter-Newton House.  Neither of the homes were for sale, however, upon more inquiry, the owners of the Carter-Newton house were in agreement to sell.

As fate would have it, an ancestor, ((James B. Glover)), was the college roommate of ((Ed Newton)) and even best man at Ed's marriage to ((Polly Weihe)) on August 17, 1940, in Newark, Delaware.

On August 17, 2021, on the day of their parents 81st wedding anniversary, the Newton boys sold the house to Jim.  It was official, James (Jim) Glover was the new owner of the Carter-Newton-Glover House.

References

External links
 Teacher's Heritage Resource Guide, Morgan County, Vol. II
 Madison’s History and Development, Chapter 1, page 4; www.madisonga.com/4/documents/10594.pdg

Houses completed in 1849
Houses in Morgan County, Georgia
Scotch-Irish American culture in Georgia (U.S. state)
Historic district contributing properties in Georgia (U.S. state)
Houses on the National Register of Historic Places in Georgia (U.S. state)
Madison, Georgia
1849 establishments in Georgia (U.S. state)
National Register of Historic Places in Morgan County, Georgia
Greek Revival houses in Georgia (U.S. state)